Nelson Gabriel is a fictional character from the British BBC Radio 4 soap opera The Archers and was portrayed by Jack May.

Casting
May was approached by producer Tony Shryane to join The Archers as Nelson in 1952. May remained with the show until January 1997 when he was forced to leave due to his declining health. He died later that year.

Storylines
Nelson was the son of Walter Gabriel (Chris Gittins), the village carrier and self-appointed "character". He was charged with the Borchester mail-van robbery in 1967, but was eventually acquitted. After spells in London and Spain, in 1980, he ran a wine bar and later an antique shop with Kenton Archer. Finally, he disappeared to South America, where he died from strange circumstances.

Reception
Listeners voted Nelson the "greatest rogue" in Archers history, while a writer for SOAP magazine named him one of the "10 Great Archers Characters". They said "Son of the late, lamented Walter Gabriel whose eloquence and erudition cloak a shady past involving criminal activity and a suspicious absence of any love interest anywhere along the way, though he mysteriously acquired a daughter somewhere down the line."

References

External links
Character profile at the BBC

The Archers characters
Fictional bartenders
Fictional con artists
Fictional British people
Male characters in radio
Radio characters introduced in 1952